Nisaga is a genus of moths in the family Eupterotidae.

Species
 Nisaga rufescens Hampson, 1895
 Nisaga simplex Walker, 1855

References

Eupterotinae
Moth genera